Inspiration is the third album by  Bay Area-based R&B group Maze.  Released in 1979 on Capitol Records.

Track listing
All Songs Written by  Frankie Beverly

"Lovely Inspiration" - 5:08 	
"Feel That You're Feelin'" - 5:33 	
"Call On Me" - 5:42 	
"Timin'" - 5:02 	
"Welcome Home" - 5:08 	
"Woman is a Wonder" - 7:20
"Ain't It Strange" - 5:27	
"Lovely Inspiration" (instrumental) - 1:56

Charts

Singles

External links
 Maze Featuring Frankie Beverly -Inspiration at Discogs

References

1979 albums
Maze (band) albums
Capitol Records albums
Albums recorded at Studio in the Country